Kruszewo  is a village in the administrative district of Gmina Ujście, within Piła County, Greater Poland Voivodeship, in west-central Poland.

The village has a population of 889.

References

Kruszewo